Puja Banerjee is an Indian actress who appears predominantly in Bengali films and Hindi television. She is well known for playing Vrinda in the show Tujh Sang Preet Lagai Sajna, which aired on Star Plus. She participated in Jhalak Dikhhla Jaa (2014), Comedy Nights Bachao (2015) and Bigg Boss Bangla (2016).

Career
After starting her television career with Kahaani Hamaaray Mahaabhaarat Ki, Banerjee was seen in the romantic show Tujh Sang Preet Lagai Sajna, in which she played the role of a simple Punjabi girl, Vrinda.

She made her debut in the Telugu film titled Veedu Theda. She has also acted in the film Macho Mustanaa, with Hiran Chatterjee (formerly called Macho Mustafaa), but the title was changed due to objections from Muslim clerics regarding the use of the word "Mustafaa". She won a role in Raja Chanda's film Challenge 2, starring Deepak Adhikari and Sujit Mondal's film Rocky, starring Mahaakshay Chakraborty. Another unconfirmed movie is Diwana Holo Mon, opposite Hiran Chatterjee.

Banerjee participated in Jhalak Dikhhla Jaa 7, where she was credited as Puja Bose. Her choreographer was Rajit Dev, who is also the chief choreographer to Vaibhavi Merchant.

From 2015 to 2017, she appeared in Comedy Nights Bachao. Banerjee later joined the cast of Zee TV's Qubool Hai playing the role of Afreen. She also played Yasmine in Razia Sultan which aired on &TV. In 2016, she participated in Bigg Boss Bangla and Comedy Nights Live.

In 2017, she played Mehak in Dev which also starred Ashish Chaudhary and Sumona Chakravarti. She returned to the show in 2018 with season 2. In 2019, she participated in Kitchen Champion 5 and Khatra Khatra Khatra followed by playing Makdina in Vish. In 2020, she played Vaishno Devi in Jag Janani Maa Vaishno Devi - Kahani Mata Rani Ki.

In 2022 after a hiatus of two years Banerjee returned to acting with StarPlus's Anupamaa's prequel web series Anupama: Namaste America as Ritika.

Personal life
In 2020, she married her Tujh Sang Preet Lagai Sajna co star Kunal Verma. In October 2020, Banerjee and Verma became parents to a baby boy and named him Krishiv.

Filmography

Television

Web series

Music videos

References

External links

Living people
Actresses in Bengali cinema
Bengali television actresses
Indian television actresses
Actresses from Kolkata
1987 births